MKS Mławianka Mława is a Polish football club based in Mława, Poland. The club competes in the III liga, group I. Between 15 May 1997 and 29 October 2010 the club was called MKS Mława temporarily dropping Mławianka from their name.

Fans
The club has a small number of active supporters. The newest is called Mławska Wiara who also support Legia Warszawa and have good relations with fans of KS Łomianki. The older group Młoda Horda, support Lechia Gdańsk, and have good relations with fans of Mazur Pisz. The two groups have a bitter rivalry with each other.

All fans have major rivalries with Wkra Żuromin and MKS Ciechanów

Major achievements 
 1st place in 3rd league in the 2003–04 season;
 promotion to 2nd league in the 2004–05 season.

Notable players
Players who have played in a top national division	
 Aka Adek Mba
 Maxwell Kalu
 Rafał Szwed

See also 
 Football in Poland
 List of football teams

References

External links
 Official site at facebook.com
 Mławianka Mława at 90minut.pl

Association football clubs established in 1923
1923 establishments in Poland
Mława County
Football clubs in Masovian Voivodeship